The Masked Bride is a 1925 American silent romantic drama film directed by Christy Cabanne and starring Mae Murray, Francis X. Bushman, and Basil Rathbone. It is currently a lost film.

Plot
As described in a review in a film magazine, Gaby (Murray) is an Apache dancer at a cabaret in the Montmartre section of Paris whose dancing partner Antoine (Rathbone) and friends are thieves. She meets Grover (Bushman), an American millionaire who is a reformer and making a study of crime. She kids him along, even falling in with her partners' scheme to rob him of a valuable necklace. She plays the game to the extent of preparing for the ceremony, but her better self comes to the fore when she realizes the depth of the American's love and the duplicity of her sweetheart who chose the necklace in preference to her. She finds happiness as the American's wife.

Cast

Production
Josef von Sternberg was originally hired to direct the film. After two weeks of filming, he became frustrated with Mae Murray's behavior on the set and ordered the cameramen to film the rafters. He eventually walked out on the picture and was replaced by Christy Cabanne.

References

External links

Stills at silenthollywood.com
Stills at basilrathbone.net

1925 films
1925 romantic drama films
American romantic drama films
American black-and-white films
Films directed by Christy Cabanne
Metro-Goldwyn-Mayer films
American silent feature films
Lost American films
1925 lost films
1920s English-language films
1920s American films
Silent romantic drama films
Silent American drama films